Gmane (pronounced "mane") is an e-mail to news gateway.  It allows users to access electronic mailing lists as if they were Usenet newsgroups, and also through a variety of web interfaces. Since Gmane is a bidirectional gateway, it can also be used to post on the mailing lists. Gmane is an archive; it never expires messages (unless explicitly requested by users).  Gmane also supports importing list postings made prior to a list's inclusion on the service.

The project was initiated in 2001 by Lars Magne Ingebrigtsen, one of the authors of Gnus, a newsreader for Emacs.  It began operating publicly on 11 February 2002 after a one-month test period.

, Gmane's homepage stated that it included 129,592,482 messages in its archives, from a total of 20,070 mailing lists.

In July 2016, Ingebrigtsen announced that he was considering shutting Gmane down, and the web interface was taken offline. In August 2016 Gmane was acquired by Yomura Holdings. Only the message spool was transferred, with the software behind the site having to be redeveloped. On the 6 September 2016, it was announced that the Gmane web interface would be coming online again. However, by February 2018 a LWN.net article observed that the web interface did "never [...] return, breaking thousands of links across the net. The front page still says 'some things are very broken' and links to a blog page that was last updated in September 2016."

In January 2020, the server hosting the e-mail to news service, still operated by Ingebrigtsen, needed to be moved following the sale of a company Ingebrigtsen had co-founded. Due to failure of the current owners of gmane.org to update a DNS entry—resulting in the unavailability of news.gmane.org—Ingebrigtsen obtained a replacement domain, gmane.io, and migrated the 15,000 mailing lists to a new server at the new address using a combination of automation, volunteer labor, and manual processes. It is currently available only by newsreader as the website formerly operated by Yomura has not been recreated.

Example
wikien-l is an electronic mailing list for discussion concerning the English-language Wikipedia. Via the standard email interface, users post messages by emailing them to wikien-l@lists.wikimedia.org, and these are forwarded by email to everyone who subscribes to the list.

Gmane permits users to access this mailing list as if it were a Usenet newsgroup instead, by using the news server news.gmane.io and group name gmane.science.linguistics.wikipedia.english. Messages posted to the list by email will appear in the Gmane newsgroup, and vice versa.

Spam protection
Incoming mail is checked by SpamAssassin and anti-virus software so that spam and viruses are hidden or deleted. Outgoing mail is checked by TMDA to make sure that no spam will be posted to the lists using Gmane.

Other list-archiving services
Other services which can archive mailing lists include The Mail Archive, Nabble, MarkMail, MARC, MailBrowse, the old Google Groups user interface (the interface which was standard until 2012), Gossamer Threads, and OpenSubscriber.

References

External links
Gmane
Gmane's complete list of hosted lists
Gmane is built on free software - downloadable here

Webmail
Electronic mailing lists
Usenet clients